Evelyn Charles Hodges (8 August 1887 – 18 March 1980) was an eminent Irish clergyman during the mid-20th century.

He was born in Towlerton House, County Carlow on  8 August 1887 into an ecclesiastical family. His father was the  Rev. W. H. Hodges. He was educated at Rathmines School
and Trinity College, Dublin and  ordained in 1911. He was a Curate at Drumcondra and then  Rathmines. Following this he spent seven years as Diocesan Inspector of Schools  for Dublin, Glendalough and Kildare before returning to Rathmines as its incumbent, serving from 1924 until 1927. From 1928 to 1943 he was Principal of the Church of Ireland Training College for Teachers, when he became the  Bishop of Limerick, Ardfert and Aghadoe. He resigned in 1960 and died on 18 March 1980.

He wrote a biography of the Church of Ireland clergyman Ernest Lewis-Crosby.

References

  

1887 births
People from County Carlow
Alumni of Trinity College Dublin
20th-century Anglican bishops in Ireland
Bishops of Limerick, Ardfert and Aghadoe
1980 deaths
People educated at Rathmines School
Diocese of Limerick, Ardfert and Aghadoe